The Spanish guitarist and composer Emilio Pujol or Emili Pujol Vilarrubí (1886-1980) composed 124 original works for the guitar and 275 transcriptions.

Original compositions

???
El Abejorro,
Ondinas,
Canción de Cuna,
Barcarolle,
Cubana,
Impromptu,
Piezas Españolas,
Pieza nº 2 (Guajira o Evocación Cubana),
Pieza nº 3 (Tango Español),
Preludios,
Scottish Madrileño,
Sevilla,
Danzas Españolas,
Tango,

Solo guitar
 ME 7899 Aquelarre (Danse des sorcières - 1969) Pujol n°1246,
 ME 7028 Atardecer (Crépuscule) Pujol n°1229,
 ME 7238 Barcarolle Pujol n°1235,
 ME 7580 Becqueriana (Endecha) Pujol n°1240,
 ME 3130 Cancion de Cuna (Berceuse) Pujol n°1203,
 ME 7884 Canto de Otono (Chant d’automne) Pujol n°1245,
 ME 7939 Cap i Cua (Variation désuète sur l’exercice 19 d’Aguado) Pujol n°1248,
 ME 7848 Caprice varié sur un thème d’Aguado Pujol n°1242,
 ME 7541 Endecha a la Amada Ausente Pujol n°1238,
 ME 2186 Étude n°1 Pujol n°1200,
 ME 2187 Étude n°2 Pujol n°1201,
 ME 2188 Étude n°3 Pujol n°1202,
 ME 3128	Exercices en formes d’études, 1. Cahier Pujol n°1221,
 ME 7847 2. Cahier Pujol n°1243,
 ME 2189 Impromptu Pujol n°1206,
 ME 7579 La Libelula Pujol n°1239,
 ME 2586-88	Trois Morceaux espagnols:
 Tonadilla,
 Tango,
 Guajira Pujol n°1204,
 ME 3129 Pequena Romanza Pujol n°1222,
 ME 7885 Pizzicato Pujol n°1247,
 ME 7236 Deux Préludes Pujol n°1233,
 ME 7027 Rapsodie Valenciana Pujol n°1228,
 ME 2190 Sevilla (Evocation) Pujol n°1205,
 ME 7030 Triquilandia (Jugando al Escondite) Pujol n°1231,
 ME 7237	2e Triquilandia:
 Œdipe et le Sphinx,
 Variation,
 Jeu,
 La Plume de perdreau,
. Branle bourguignon Pujol n°1234,
 ME 7533	3e Triquilandia,
 Le Petit Grenadier,
 Cantilène,
Valse Pujol n°1241,
 ME 7991	Triptyque campagnard (1971):
 Aube,
 Bucolique,
 Fête Pujol n°1249,
 ME 7883 Variations sur un thème obsédant Pujol n°1244,
 ME 7029 Veneciana Pujol n°1230,

Guitar duos
 ME 8046 Canaries (Canarios), air de danse populaire ancienne Pujol n°1415,
 ME 8081-01 Duet (étude) Pujol n°1417a,
 ME 6942 Manola del Avapies (Tonadilla) Pujol n°1403,
 ME 7239 Ricercare Pujol n°1409,
 ME 8081 Tyrolienne (Tirolesa) Pujol n°1417b,

(Verleger: Max Eschig Paris)

Transcriptions

Guitar duo
Francis Poulenc (1899–1963). Waltzes, arr from the piano Paris : Editions M. Eschig, c1970.

References

Pujol, Emilio, compositions by